Anna Hegner (1 March 1881 – 3 February 1963) was a Swiss violinist, music composer and pedagogue.

Biography 
Anna Hegner was born in Basel into a respected family of musicians and became well known as a violin soloist. She was recognised for her concerts in Basel, Berlin, Leipzig and London. For some time she lived and worked in Frankfurt and was Paul Hindemith's violin teacher. In 1908 she moved to Münchenstein and there she organized classical concerts in the Catholic Church (also performing as soloist) and organized summer concerts in the small gorge behind her house. She died in hospital in 1963 from the effects of an accident. Soon after her death the Anna-Hegner-Strasse was named after her and for a long time she was the only woman in the Basel area to be honored with a street name.

Literature 
Münchenstein Heimatkunde. Verlag des Kantons Basel-Landschaft, Liestal 1995, .

Musicians from Basel-Stadt
Münchenstein
Swiss classical violinists
Swiss women composers
1881 births
1963 deaths
20th-century women musicians
20th-century classical violinists
Women classical violinists